Sari Molag is a village of Himachal Pradesh, under Tehshil Jaisinghpur, Kangra district, India.

See also
 Jaisinghpur

Villages in Kangra district